Jeffrey David Charleston (born January 19, 1983) is a former American football defensive end. He was signed by the Houston Texans as an undrafted free agent in 2006. He played college football at Idaho State University.

Charleston has also been a member of the New Orleans Saints, Indianapolis Colts and Minnesota Vikings. Charleston was part of the Super Bowl champion Saints during the 2009-2010 season.

Early years 
Charleston attended Central High School in Independence, Oregon.  He lettered three years in football and basketball and was first-team all-Oregon pick at tight end and second-team all-state at linebacker.

College career 
Charleston played for three seasons at Division II Western Oregon. He was a two-time All-Great Northwest Athletic Conference pick; as a sophomore, he led the team in sacks (4.5), tackles for losses (10.5) and FR (4) and ranked 3rd on team with 69 tackles.  He then decided to transfer to Idaho State University for both athletic and academic reasons.  He sat out the 2004 season per NCAA transfer regulations, then played one season for Idaho State. As a senior, he registered 12 sacks, and had 56 tackles, five passes defended, two FF and 19 tackles for losses. He was voted Defensive and Newcomer Player-of-the-Year in the Big Sky Conference.

Professional career

Indianapolis Colts
Originally signed as an undrafted free agent by Houston on May 4, 2006, he was waived on September 1, 2006. The Colts signed him on January 4, 2007. In 2007, he started three of 13 games at RDE (starting the final three games for injured DE-Robert Mathis) and totaled 42 tackles, 22 solo, one sack, four pressures, one FF and two passes batted.  The Colts waived him in August 2008.

New Orleans Saints
Charleston was signed by the Saints for the 2008 season. He played in 10 games in 2008. In the 2009 season, Charleson played in 19 games, tallying 23 tackles. On January 2, 2011, Charleston recovered a fumble of Buccaneers quarterback Josh Freeman when he was hit by Charleston.

Minnesota Vikings
On June 28, 2012, Charleston was signed by the Minnesota Vikings. On August 31, as the Vikings reduced their roster down to league maximum of 53 players, he was released.

Tampa Bay Buccaneers
The Tampa Bay Buccaneers signed him on September 26, 2012. On October 2, 2012, he was released.

Personal life
Charleston married Reagan Charleston (née Tucker) in 2012. In 2018, the couple appeared together on Southern Charm New Orleans. In May 2018, the couple announced they were separating and they divorced later that year.

In October 2020, Charleston married his girlfriend Maddie.

References

External links
Idaho State Bengals bio
New Orleans Saints bio

Living people
1983 births
Sportspeople from Oregon City, Oregon
Players of American football from Oregon
American football defensive ends
Western Oregon Wolves football players
Idaho State Bengals football players
Houston Texans players
Indianapolis Colts players
New Orleans Saints players
Minnesota Vikings players
Tampa Bay Buccaneers players
People from Independence, Oregon
Idaho State University alumni